Nasséré is a town in the Nasséré Department of Bam Province in northern-central Burkina Faso. It is the capital of the Nasséré Department and has a population of 1,015.

References

Populated places in the Centre-Nord Region
Bam Province